Greve Graphics was the first video game developer in Sweden and Scandinavia. The company was founded in 1984, by Nils Hård (graphics) and Bengt Caroli (programmer). Lars Hård (music) was asked to join. The publisher was American Action.

Releases
Greve Graphics developed and released the following games:

 1985 – Soldier One , a wargame consisting of seven minigames. The game was marketed hard in Scandinavia; hundreds of thousands kids received an advertisement leaflet in their mailboxes. The game sold over 75.000 copies in Sweden.
 1986 – The SuperCan / Captured, multiple names during development
 1986 – Blood'n guts
 1987 – 1943 – One Year After

Unreleased:
 1987 – Goremium

Four of the company's games were re-released in a collection 1987 called 4 Action Hits.

Greve Graphics also released a development kit called The Basic Revenge.

References

External links

Homepages
gd64.com's page about Greve Graphic's game Soldier One
Lemon64.com's page about Greve Graphic's game Soldier One
gd64.com's page about Greve Graphic's game Captured
Lemon64.com's page about Greve Graphic's game Captured
ZZAP!'s page about Greve Graphic's game Captured
gd64.com's page about Greve Graphic's game The Super Can
gd64.com's page about Greve Graphic's game Blood'n guts
Lemon64.com's page about Greve Graphic's game Blood'n guts
ZZAP!'s page about Greve Graphic's game Blood'n guts
gd64.com's page about Greve Graphic's game 1943 – One Year After
Lemon64.com's page about Greve Graphic's game 1943 – One Year After
ZZAP!'s page about Greve Graphic's game 1943 – One Year After

Videos
Loadingsceen for Soldier One
Longplay of Soldier One

Defunct video game companies of Sweden
Video game companies established in 1984
1984 establishments in Sweden